Igor Petrovich Volk (12 April 1937 – 3 January 2017) was a Soviet test pilot and cosmonaut in the Buran programme.

Military and test pilot 
Volk became a pilot in the Soviet Air Forces in 1956. After graduation from the Fedotov Test Pilot School in 1965, he has joined the Gromov Flight Research Institute. He logged over 7000 flight hours in over 80 different aircraft types. Over the years, he flew on all types of Soviet fighters, bombers, and transport aircraft. He showed outstanding abilities in complex tests of various airplanes at critical angles of attack, stall, and spin. He was the first who tested aircraft behavior at high super-critical angles of attack (around 90°) and performed aerobatics such as the "cobra" maneuver.

Space program 

Igor Volk was selected as a cosmonaut on 12 July 1977 and subsequently assigned to the Buran programme. As part of his preparations for a space shuttle flight, he also accomplished test-flights with Buran's counterpart OK-GLI aircraft. 

In July 1984, Volk flew aboard Soyuz T-12, intended to give him some experience in space. With Volks's participation as Research Cosmonaut on the 7th expedition to Salyut 7, one goal of the mission was to evaluate the effects of long-duration spaceflight on a pilot skills and ability to fly and land an aeroplane safely (in order to prove Volk's ability to control Space Shuttle Buran atmospheric segment of flight). At the time of the Soyuz T-12 mission the Buran program was still a state secret. The appearance of Volk as a crew member caused some, including the British Interplanetary Society magazine Spaceflight, to ask why a test pilot was occupying a Soyuz seat usually reserved for researchers or foreign cosmonauts.

After his orbital flight, Volk served as the head of pilot-cosmonaut training department for the Buran program and later (after the project's cancellation) worked for the Gromov Flight Research Institute as a Flight Tests Deputy Chief before retiring in 1996. He previously served as President of the National Aero Club of Russia and Vice President of the Fédération Aéronautique Internationale. As recognition for his contributions as a test pilot and cosmonaut he was awarded the Hero of the Soviet Union on 29 July 1984.

Other accomplishments 
Volk was also an inventor and was planning a new four-person concept flying car, called the Lark-4 which takes off and lands at 45 km/h (28 mph) using a 27-meter (89 ft) runway. It consumes 11 litres (3 gallons) of fuel for every  traveled and cruises at around 637 km/h (396 mph).

Personal life
Volk was married and had two children. He died on 3 January 2017 while on holiday in Plovdiv, Bulgaria. He is buried together with his daughter at the Bykovskoye Memorial Cemetery in Zhukovsky.

Honours and awards
 Hero of the Soviet Union
 Pilot-Cosmonaut of the USSR
 Honoured Test Pilot of the USSR
 Zhukovsky Honorary Citizen 
 Order "For Merit to the Fatherland" 4th class
 Order of Lenin 
 Order of the Red Banner of Labour 
 Order of Friendship of Peoples 
 Medal "For Merit in Space Exploration"

Memory

Bust of Igor Volk is installed at Solnechnaya Street in the city of Zhukovsky.

References

External links
Detailed biography of Igor Volk
Biography at Astronautix

1937 births
2017 deaths
People from Zmiiv
Buran program
Fedotov TPS alumni
Gromov Flight Research Institute employees
Moscow Aviation Institute alumni
Heroes of the Soviet Union
Recipients of the Order "For Merit to the Fatherland", 4th class
Recipients of the Order of Friendship of Peoples
Recipients of the Order of Lenin
Recipients of the Order of the Red Banner of Labour
Recipients of the Medal "For Merit in Space Exploration"
Soviet Air Force officers
Soviet cosmonauts
Soviet test pilots